Palaeophyllites is a genus of ammonoids from the Lower Triassic and a contemporary of the related ussuritid Eophyllites.

The shell of Palaeophyllites is evolute,  inner whorls generally smooth, outer whorl with irregular ribs. Sutures are basically ceratitic with digitate lobes and simple rounded monophyllic saddles. Paleophyllites differs from contemporary Eophyllites in having ribs on the outer part of the terminal whorl and lobes that are more quadrate in outline.

Like Eophyllites, Palaeophyllites is ancestral to genera like Ussurites and Monophyllites.

References 

 W.J. Arkell et al., 1957. Mesozoic Ammonoidea, Treatise on Invertebrate Paleontology, Part L. Geological Society of America and University of Kansas Press
 Sepkoski's list of Cephalopod Genera 

Ammonitida genera
Triassic ammonites
Ammonites of Europe